Academy Hill Historic District may refer to:

 Academy Hill Historic District (Andover, Massachusetts), listed on the NRHP in Massachusetts
 Westminster Village-Academy Hill Historic District, Westminster, MA, listed on the NRHP in Massachusetts
 Union Street-Academy Hill Historic District, Montgomery, NY, listed on the NRHP in New York
 Academy Hill Historic District (Statesville, North Carolina), listed on the NRHP in Iredell County, North Carolina
 Academy Hill Historic District (Greensburg, Pennsylvania), listed on the NRHP in Pennsylvania
 Academy Hill Historic District (Stroudsburg, Pennsylvania), listed on the NRHP in Monroe County, Pennsylvania